In enzymology, a (S)-3-hydroxyacid-ester dehydrogenase is an enzyme that catalyzes the chemical reaction

ethyl (S)-3-hydroxyhexanoate + NADP  ethyl 3-oxohexanoate + NADPH + H

Thus, the two substrates of this enzyme are ethyl (S)-3-hydroxyhexanoate and NADP, whereas its 3 products are ethyl 3-oxohexanoate, NADPH, and H.

This enzyme belongs to the family of oxidoreductases, specifically those acting on the CH-OH group of donor with NAD or NADP as acceptor. The systematic name of this enzyme class is ethyl-(S)-3-hydroxyhexanoate:NADP 3-oxidoreductase. This enzyme is also called 3-oxo ester (S)-reductase.

References

 

EC 1.1.1
NADPH-dependent enzymes
Enzymes of unknown structure